Sriram Balaji and Vishnu Vardhan were the defending champions but chose not to defend their title.

Gonçalo Oliveira and Andrei Vasilevski won the title after defeating Sergey Fomin and Teymuraz Gabashvili 3–6, 6–3, [10–4] in the final.

Seeds

Draw

References

External links
 Main draw

Samarkand Challenger - Doubles
2019 Doubles